NGC 5004 is a lenticular galaxy in the constellation Coma Berenices. The object was discovered by astronomer William Herschel in 1785, using an 18.7-inch aperture reflector telescope. Due to its moderate apparent magnitude (+13), it is visible only with amateur telescopes or with superior equipment.

References

External links

Coma Berenices
5004